Shuttleworthia is a Gram-positive, non-spore-forming, obligately anaerobic and non-motile bacterial genus from the family of Lachnospiraceae with one known species (Shuttleworthia satelles). Shuttleworthia satelles has been isolated from the human periodontal pocket.

References

Lachnospiraceae
Monotypic bacteria genera
Bacteria genera